Teruhiro Sugimori (born 15 October 1982) is a Japanese speed skater. He competed at the 2006 Winter Olympics and the 2010 Winter Olympics.

References

1982 births
Living people
Japanese male speed skaters
Olympic speed skaters of Japan
Speed skaters at the 2006 Winter Olympics
Speed skaters at the 2010 Winter Olympics
Sportspeople from Hokkaido
21st-century Japanese people